Bottom of the 9th '99, known in Japan as , is a baseball video game published and developed by Konami and released in 1998 for the PlayStation.

Baltimore Orioles center fielder Brady Anderson is featured on the cover. Bottom of the 9th '99 does not have a Major League Baseball license, but it is endorsed by the Major League Baseball Players Association. This game has the 1998 opening day rosters with over 700 players. This game has six playing modes: exhibition, season, training, trade, statistics, and scenario mode.

Reception

The game received "mixed" reviews according to the review aggregation website GameRankings. In Japan, Famitsu gave it a score of 22 out of 40.

References

External links
 

1998 video games
Baseball video games
Multiplayer and single-player video games
PlayStation (console) games
Video games developed in the United States